Khersdar-e Olya (also Romanized as Khersdar-e ‘Olyā; also known as Khersdar) is a village in Malavi Rural District, in the Central District of Pol-e Dokhtar County, Lorestan Province, Iran. At the 2006 census, its population was 381, in 85 families.

References 

Towns and villages in Pol-e Dokhtar County